ERAmerica was a coalition of organizations fighting for the ratification of the Equal Rights Amendment in the 1970s. The organization was bipartisan as Democrat Liz Carpenter and Republican Elly Peterson led the organization as co-chairs.

Origins 
ERAmerica was founded as a coalition of groups in 1976 and consisted of over 200 organizations. The headquarters were based in Washington, D.C. The purpose of the organization as to seek ratification of the Equal Rights Amendment (ERA). The group was ultimately unsuccessful after the ERA failed in 1982.

Leadership 

ERAmerica was a bipartisan organization. Liz Carpenter was a Democrat and Elly Peterson was a long time member of the Republican Party. Both women were founders of the National Women's Political Caucus.In 1976, Jane Wells served as campaign director of ERAmerica. In the early 1980s, Mary Hatwood Futrell served as president.  In 1982 Kathleen Currie served as director of public relations.

Member organizations 
Groups affiliated with ERAmerica included Catholics Act for ERA, Housewives for ERA, Common Cause, Girl Scouts, and the NAACP.

ERAmerica Report 
In the early 1980s, ERAmerica published a newsletter known as the ERAmerica Report. In the May 1981 edition, they noted the ERA and abortion were separate issues.

Fundraising for the cause

1977 

In 1977, ERAmerica raised $100,000 at the International Women's Year Conference in Houston.

1981 
In 1981, ERAmerica held a luncheon in Michigan where First Lady Helen Milliken spoke. Karen Street from Birmingham attended this event and told the press, "This is one of the best things I've ever done. I'm so appreciative of the women who worked for the vote I have today. Some day, I hope women will appreciate what we are doing for the ERA. I have the time to devote to this. Many other women who need it most don't have the time I do."

Donations to candidates 
In 1982, ERAmerica donated $38,650 to legislative candidates.

See also 

 Liz Carpenter 
 Billie Jean King 
 Elly Maude Peterson 
 Helen Reddy
 Jane Horton Wells

References 
Women's rights

Women's organizations based in the United States
Feminist organizations in the United States
Equal Rights Amendment organizations